Owen Gould Davis Jr. (October 6, 1907 – May 21, 1949) was an American actor known primarily for his work in film. He also performed in the theatre, making his Broadway debut in the play Carry On (1928), which his father, Owen Davis, had written.

Biography
Born in 1907 in New York City, Davis Jr. was the son of dramatist Owen Davis and his wife, actress Elizabeth Breyer. In 1923 his father won the Pulitzer Prize for drama for his play Icebound.

Educated at Yale University, Davis was one of the leading students in the drama school. He was chosen captain of the boxing team.

On stage, Davis made his Broadway debut in the play Carry On (1928), written by his father Owen Davis. He soon began working in film, making his screen debut with Walter Huston. Later he toured on stage with Huston. After gaining more stage experience, Davis went to Hollywood and began to specialize in movies.

Davis served in the United States Army during World War II. Afterward, he became a television producer.

He married Laina Muroni.

Davis died on May 21, 1949. He drowned in a sailing accident on Long Island Sound.

Filmography

External links
 
 

1907 births
1949 deaths
American male film actors
American male stage actors
Deaths by drowning in the United States
Accidental deaths in New York (state)
20th-century American male actors